In telephony, the long-distance operator is a telephone operator available to assist with making long distance telephone calls (or toll calls in British English), answering billing questions, making collect calls and other functions.

See also
 International operator services

Telephony